The 2020 United States Senate election in Illinois was held on November 3, 2020, to elect a member of the United States Senate to represent the State of Illinois, concurrently with the 2020 U.S. presidential election, as well as other elections to the United States Senate, elections to the United States House of Representatives and various state and local elections and the Illinois Fair Tax. Incumbent Democratic Senator Dick Durbin, who had been Senate Minority Whip since 2015, won reelection to a fifth term in office, defeating Republican nominee Mark Curran.

Durbin decisively won re-election with 54.9% of the vote. Key to Durbin's landslide victory was the heavily populated and very Democratic Cook County home of Chicago, which he won by around 560,000 votes. Durbin also did well in the suburban, often called collar counties of Chicago, winning all of them except McHenry County. Durbin did well in Champaign County, home of the University of Illinois, and St. Clair County, where his birth home of East St. Louis is located. Nevertheless, this was Durbin's first election in which he failed to win the formerly Democratic-leaning rural Alexander County. Curran did well in most rural areas of the state, including winning rural Alexander County where a Republican hasn't won since 1972. Durbin became the first senator from Illinois to be elected five consecutive times since senators began being elected by popular vote in 1913.

Durbin flipped eight counties that he lost in 2014 that being DeKalb, DuPage, Kane, Kendall, McLean, Peoria, Will and Winnebago counties, but lost the counties of Alexander, Calhoun, Gallatin, Pulaski and Whiteside.

Election information
The primaries and general elections coincide with those for federal (president and House) and those for state offices.

Turnout
For the primaries, turnout was 28.36% with 2,279,439 votes cast.

Democratic primary

Candidates

Nominee
 Dick Durbin, incumbent U.S. Senator and Senate Minority Whip

Withdrawn
 Marilyn Jordan Lawlor, anti-war activist
 Anne Stava-Murray, state representative

Declined
 Cheri Bustos, incumbent U.S. Representative for Illinois's 17th congressional district (running for re-election)
 Lisa Madigan, former Illinois Attorney General

Endorsements

Results

Republican primary

Candidates

Nominee
 Mark Curran, former Lake County sheriff and candidate for Attorney General in 2014

Eliminated in primary
 Casey Chlebek, businessman
 Peggy Hubbard, U.S. Navy veteran and former police officer
 Robert Marshall, physician and perennial candidate, Democratic primary candidate for Governor of Illinois in 2018
 Richard Mayers (as a write-in candidate), perennial candidate and alleged white supremacist;
 Tom Tarter, cancer surgeon

Withdrew
 Preston Nelson, Republican candidate for Illinois's 12th congressional district in 2018(Ran for IL-08 as a Libertarian)
 Dean Seppelfrick
 Connor Vlakancic, CEO of 5Star Inc. (switched to independent)

Declined
Rodney Davis, incumbent U.S. Representative for Illinois's 13th congressional district (running for re-election)
Erika Harold, attorney, former Miss America, candidate for IL-13 in 2014, and nominee for attorney general in 2018
Darin LaHood, incumbent U.S. Representative for Illinois's 18th congressional district (running for re-election)

Endorsements

Results

Other candidates
A legal ruling, taking note of the COVID-19 pandemic in Illinois, allowed the Libertarian and Green Parties to have their selected candidate on the ballot without the normal signature requirements, as they each ran a candidate for U.S. Senate in 2016.

Constitution Party

Removed from Ballot
Chad Koppie, Constitution Party nominee for the 2018 Illinois gubernatorial election, write-in nominee for the 2016 US Senate election in Illinois, candidate for the 2014 US Senate election in Illinois, Kane County School Board Member and retired pilot

Green Party

Nominee
David F. Black, Green Party nominee for Illinois Attorney General in 2010

Independent American Party

Withdrawn
Keith Richardson

Libertarian Party

Nominee
Danny Malouf, human resource director, former Republican candidate for the 2020 Illinois 14th congressional district election

Willie Wilson Party

Declared
 Willie Wilson, businessman and perennial candidate

Independents

Declared
 Kevin Keely, substitute teacher and community activist (as a write-in candidate)
 Albert A. Schaal (as a write-in candidate)
 Lowell Martin Seida, perennial candidate (as a write-in candidate)

Withdrawn
 Patrick Feges
 Julie Rushing
 Connor Vlakancic, affiliated with the Republican Party (switched from Republican candidacy)

General election

Predictions

Endorsements

Polling

with Dick Durbin, generic Republican and Willie Wilson

with Dick Durbin and Willie Wilson

Results 
Durbin also kept his landslide winning streak by winning with at least a ten-point margin. Durbin was sworn in on January 3, 2021, for his fifth term, which expires on January 3, 2027.

Notes

 Partisan clients

References

External links
 
 
  (State affiliate of the U.S. League of Women Voters)
 

Official campaign websites
 David Black (G) for U.S. Senate 
 Mark Curran (R) for U.S. Senate
 Dick Durbin (D) for U.S. Senate
 Danny Malouf (L) for U.S. Senate 
 Willie Wilson (I) for U.S. Senate 

2020
Illinois
United States Senate